Real Betis Balompié Féminas is the women's football club of Real Betis. Based in Seville, Andalusia, Spain, the club competes in the Liga F, the top league in Spain. Home matches are played at Ciudad Deportiva Luis del Sol.

History
The women's team of Real Betis was founded in 2011 after integrating local team Azahar CF into the structure of the club.

In its first season, the club could not promote to Segunda División, but achieved a vacant spot for playing in the league. Four years later, on 22 June 2016, Real Betis promoted to Primera División.

Players

Current squad

Source:

Season to season

References

External links
Official website

Real Betis
Women's football clubs in Spain
Association football clubs established in 2011
2011 establishments in Spain
Primera División (women) clubs
Football clubs in Andalusia
Sport in Seville